Carlos Alfredo Contreras Zambrano, (born 22 January 1995) is a Chilean former footballer who played  as a midfielder.

Club career
He professionally debuted on 1 March 2015 in a 1–0 away win over Ñublense in Chillán for the 2015 Torneo Clausura.

After three years – from 2018 to 2020 – at amateur leagues, along with Rodelindo Román he got promotion to the Chilean Segunda División for the 2021 season.

In November 2021, he announced his retirement as a professional footballer.

Personal life
He is nicknamed Colocho like the Argentine Fabricio Coloccini and Manuel Iturra.

Honours
Barnechea
Segunda División: 2016-17
 
Rodelindo Román
Tercera B: 2019

References

External links
 

1995 births
Living people
Footballers from Santiago
Chilean footballers
Colo-Colo B footballers
Colo-Colo footballers
A.C. Barnechea footballers
Deportes Valdivia footballers
Rodelindo Román footballers
Segunda División Profesional de Chile players
Chilean Primera División players
Primera B de Chile players
Association football midfielders